Southern Rural English may refer to:
Rural varieties of English in southern England
Southern American English, also known as "Rural White Southern English"